Giengen (Brenz) station is a railway station in the municipality of Giengen an der Brenz, located in the Heidenheim district in Baden-Württemberg, Germany.

References

Railway stations in Baden-Württemberg
Buildings and structures in Heidenheim (district)